The following is a list of Florida State Seminoles softball seasons. The Florida State Seminoles are a member of the Atlantic Coast Conference of the NCAA Division I. The Seminoles have won 18 conference championships, appeared in the NCAA Division I softball tournament 34 times, and in the Women's College World Series 11 times.  The Seminoles won the National Championship in 2018, and were runner-up in 2021.

Season results

References

Florida State
Florida State Seminoles softball